Coffee United Sports Club, or short Coffee, is a Ugandan football club from Kakira.

They play in the Second division of Ugandan football, the Ugandan Big League.

In 1970 the team has won the Ugandan Super League.

Honours
Ugandan Super League:1970

Performance in CAF competitions
1971 African Cup of Champions Clubs:
1982 African Cup Winners' Cup

References

External links

Football clubs in Uganda